Crematogaster barbouri is a species of ant in tribe Crematogastrini. It was described by Weber in 1934.

References

barbouri
Insects described in 1934